In the run up to the 2019 Ukrainian parliamentary elections, various organisations carried out opinion polling to gauge voter intention in Ukraine. The results of the polls are displayed in this article.

The date range for these opinion polls is from the previous parliamentary election, to the day of the election. The general election was held on 21 July 2019.

Polling

Graphical summaries

Poll results

See also
Opinion polling for the 2019 Ukrainian presidential election

Notes

References

Ukraine
2019
2019 elections in Ukraine
Parliamentary elections in Ukraine